Ken Okoth (7 Jan 1978 - 26 July 2019) was a Kenyan politician who served as the Member of Parliament for Kibra Constituency from 2013 to 26 July 2019 when he died from complications caused by colorectal cancer. He was succeeded as MP for Kibra Constituency by his brother, Imran Okoth.

References

External links
 

1978 births
2019 deaths
Place of birth missing
Place of death missing
People from Nairobi
Members of the National Assembly (Kenya)
Deaths from colorectal cancer